The Yayangshan Dam (崖羊山大坝) is a concrete-face rock-fill dam on the Lixian River, bordering the counties of Ning'er and Mojiang in Yunnan Province, China. The primary purpose of the dam is hydroelectric power generation and it supports a 120 MW power station. Construction began in 2003, the river was diverted in 2004 and the two 60 MW generators were commissioned in 2006. It is the first dam in the Lixian River cascade.

See also

List of dams and reservoirs in China
List of major power stations in Yunnan

External links

References

Dams in China
Hydroelectric power stations in Yunnan
Concrete-face rock-fill dams
Dams completed in 2006
Dams on the Black River (Asia)
Buildings and structures in Pu'er